Death by Invitation is a 1971 American horror film written and directed by Ken Friedman and produced by Mitchell Block. It stars Shelby Leverington, Aaron Phillips, and Norman Parker.

Premise
Lise, a woman from the Colonial era who was burned at the stake for the crime of witchcraft, is reincarnated and seeks vengeance upon the descendants of those who killed her.

Cast
 Shelby Leverington as Lise
 Aaron Phillips as Peter Vroot
 Norman Parker as Jake (credited as Norman Paige)

Home media
In May 2013, Death by Invitation was released on DVD by Vinegar Syndrome as a double feature with the 1979 film Savage Water. Vinegar Syndrome also released Death by Invitation on DVD as a double feature with the 1962 film The Dungeon of Harrow.

References

External links
 
 

American supernatural horror films
1971 horror films
1971 films
American films about revenge
Films about witchcraft
Witch hunting in fiction
1970s English-language films
1970s American films